Thomas Willie Lott Jr. (born August 1, 1957) is an American former college and professional football player who was a running back and return specialist in the National Football League (NFL) and United States Football League (USFL).  Lott played college football at Oklahoma, where he was a quarterback.  He played two professional seasons, one each in the NFL for the St. Louis Cardinals and the USFL for the New Jersey Generals, where he enjoyed a successful  season returning kickoffs for the Generals, totaling over 1,100 yards.

References

1957 births
Living people
Players of American football from San Antonio
American football running backs
American football quarterbacks
Oklahoma Sooners football players
St. Louis Cardinals (football) players
New Jersey Generals players